Waggag Ibn Zallu al-Lamti (died 11th-century in Aglu near Tiznit, Morocco) was a Moroccan Maliki scholar and jurist who lived in the 11th-century. He was a disciple of Abu Imran al-Fasi and belonged to the Lamta clan, which is a Sanhaja-Berber tribe. Waggag had an eminent role in the rise of the Almoravid Dynasty as he was the religious teacher and spiritual leader of Abdallah ibn Yasin, the founder of the dynasty.

Life
He was a native of the Sous region and traveled to Al Quaraouiyine, where he studied under Abu Imran al-Fasi. He then went to the Sous where he founded a Ribat in the village of Aglu (located near present-day Tiznit) named Ribat al-Murabitin where he took disciples and taught the Maliki doctrine.

After receiving a letter for his former teacher Abu Imran al-Fasi asking him to help teach religion to the southern Sanhaja Saharan tribes, he chose Abdallah ibn Yasin, to accompany the Gudala leader Yahya ibn Ibrahim to the Sahara. Waggag Ibn Zallu then became the spiritual guide of the Almoravid's first leader.

In relation to the Almoravid movement, some historical chronicles (e.g. al-Bakri, Ibn Abi Zar, Qadi Ayyad) give him credit in asking Abdallah ibn Yassin to fight those who disobeyed him and then commanded him to advance north to take Sijilmasa which transformed the Almoravid religious movement into a military one with much greater ambitions. It was also reported that after the death of Abdallah Ibn Yasin, only the disciples of Waggag Ibn Zallu were eligible to be appointed as religious authoritative leaders.

A hagiography of Waggag Ibn Zallu was written by Ibn al-Zayyat al-Tadili. He is buried at the Dar al-Murabitin Ribat in Aglu a village near Tiznit, Morocco where his grave became a shrine known as "Sidi Waggag".

The brothers Sulayman ibn Addu and Abu al-Qacem ibn Addu, who were the successors of Ibn Yassin as Almoravid's religious leaders were his disciples.

Transliteration of the name
Various transliteration of the name exist such as Wajjaj Ibn Zelu or Wajaj Ibn Zelwa. This is due to the fact that there is no letter for the G sound in Arabic,  besides the letter غ which is the G letter in Arabic with G sound of an English letter G, so the name was alternately written with a "ج"(j) or a "ك" (k). The "u" vowel sound is written with a "و" which can also be read as a "w" sound.

See also
Almoravid dynasty
Abu Imran al-Fasi
Abdallah ibn Yasin

Notes

References

Berber scholars
Moroccan scholars
People from Tiznit
Scholars under the Almoravid dynasty
10th-century Moroccan people
11th-century Moroccan people
Moroccan Maliki scholars
Moroccan religious leaders
10th-century Berber people
11th-century Berber people
11th-century jurists